Bo Abraham Mendel Rothstein (born 12 June 1954) is a Swedish political scientist. He is a former Professor of Government and Public Policy at University of Oxford's Blavatnik School of Government. 

Rothstein is a contributor to Swedish public debate about politics and academic freedom. He has been especially critical of what he perceives as politicized research at some universities in Sweden. In 2003, he received the Swedish Association of University Teachers' prize for academic freedom. Rothstein received the prize for having "in the public debate argued for the importance of independent university teaching and research".

Rothstein is a critic of postmodernism and identity politics.

Life
Bo Rothstein was born in Malmö, Sweden, to an Austrian-born Jewish father who fled from Germany to Sweden in 1939. Rothstein's paternal grandparents (Rosa and Samuel R.) were murdered by the Germans in Chełmno in 1942. His maternal grandparents came to Sweden around 1910 from Ukraine and Lithuania.
 
Rothstein received his Ph.D. in political science from Lund University in 1986. Between 1986 and 1995 he was assistant and in 1992 became associate professor at the Department of Government at Uppsala University. He joined the University of Oxford in January 2016, where he was also given the title of Professorial Fellow of Nuffield College, Oxford. He was a professor at University of Gothenburg from 1995 to 2015. He has been a visiting scholar at the Russell Sage Foundation, Cornell University, Harvard University, Collegium Budapest Center for Advanced Study, the Swedish Center for Advanced Study in the Social Sciences, the Australian National University, Stanford University and at the University of Washington in Seattle. In 2006 he served as Visiting Professor at Harvard University.

In 2004, he was awarded a six years research grant for "long term support to leading scholars" from the Swedish Research Council. In 2009 he received a similar five year grant from the Knut and Alice Wallenberg Foundation, the largest private research fund in Sweden. Together with Professor Sören Holmberg, he is in charge of the Quality of Government Institute at University of Gothenburg. His current research interests are comparative quality of government institutions, social capital, and political corruption. Since 2011, he is a member of the Swedish Government's Advisory Board for Research Policy.

Resignation from Blavatnik school 2017
2017 Rothstein resigned from his professorship at the Blavatnik School of Government so as to not give legitimacy to Leonard Blavatnik, one of the largest contributors to the school, due to his donations to and support of Donald Trump. The Dean of the Blavatnik School voiced her disappointment with Rothstein's departure, stating that Blavatnik's only donation was to Trump's Inaugural Committee. Leonard Blavatnik had also donated to groups supporting Marco Rubio during the Republican Primaries. 

Rothstein said that the actions of the Trump administration run contrary to all that he has worked for; Rothstein has done considerable research on the quality of political institutions, welfare politics and corruption. He currently holds the August Röhss Chair in Political Science at University of Gothenburg, Sweden. The August Röhss Chair was established in 1902 by a generous donation from August Röhss, a leading merchant in Gothenburg. Several months after his resignation from the Blavatnik School, Rothstein complained that he was no longer being allocated office space, students, or academic tasks by the School, in a letter to the Vice-Chancellor of the University of Oxford which was made public.

Writings
His books in English include:
Making Sense of Corruption (Cambridge University Press, 2017, co-author: Aiysha Varraich)
The Quality of Government: Corruption, Social Trust and Inequality in International Perspective (University of Chicago Press 2011)
The Social Democratic State: the Swedish model and the bureaucratic problem of social reforms (University of Pittsburgh Press, 1996)
Just Institutions Matter: The Moral and Political Logic of the Universal Welfare State (Cambridge Univ. Press 1998)
Restructuring the welfare state: Political Institutions and Social Change (Palgrave/Macmillan 2002, co-editor: Sven Steinmo)
Creating social trust in post-socialist transition (Palgrave/Macmillan 2004, co-editors: János Kornai and Susan Rose-Ackerman)
Social Traps and the Problem of Trust (Cambridge University Press, 2005)

According to Google Scholar his scientific publishing has an h-index of 60, which means that he is co-author to at least 60 articles which all are cited at least 60 times.

References

External links
 Bo Rothstein at Gothenburg University
 The Quality of Government Institute

1954 births
Living people
People from Malmö
Swedish Jews
Swedish people of Austrian-Jewish descent
Lund University alumni
Swedish political scientists
Fellows of Nuffield College, Oxford
Harvard University staff
Academic staff of the University of Gothenburg